Bruce Colston Trapnell Jr. (born 1982) is an assistant professor in the Department of Genome Sciences at the University of Washington. He was awarded the Overton Prize by the International Society for Computational Biology (ISCB) for “outstanding accomplishment in the early to mid stage of his career” in 2018.

References

Living people
American bioinformaticians
Overton Prize winners
1982 births
University of Washington faculty